Diamond Harbour subdivision is an administrative subdivision of the South 24 Parganas district in the Indian state of West Bengal.

Subdivisions
South 24 Parganas district is divided into five administrative subdivisions:

26.04% of the total population of South 24 Parganas district live in Diamond Harbourr subdivision.

Administrative units
Diamond Harbour subdivision has 11 police stations, 9 community development blocks, 9 panchayat samitis, 99 gram panchayats, 890 mouzas, 839 inhabited villages, 1 municipality and 35 census towns. The municipality is at Diamond Harbour. The census towns are: 
Ajodhyanagar, Sirakol, Uttar Bishnupur, Ghola Noapara, Usthi, Barijpur, Uttar Kusum, Kalikapota, Bamna, Dhamua, Shyampur, Nainan, Uttar Kalas, Dihi Kalas, Swangrampur, Bilandapur, Magrahat,  Chandpur (M), Bangsidharpur (M), Purba Bishnupur, Berandari Bagaria, Dhola, Hasimnagar, Baneshwarpur, Chandpala Anantapathpur, Fatepur, Masat, Sangrampur, Mohanpur, Durganagar, Patdaha, Krishna Chandrapur, Mathurapur, Purba Ranaghat, Lalpur,

Police stations
Police stations in Diamond Harbour subdivision have the following features and jurisdiction:

Blocks
Community development blocks in Diamond Harbour subdivision are:

Gram panchayats
The subdivision contains 99 gram panchayats under 9 community development blocks:

 Diamond Harbour I CD block consists of eight gram panchayats: Basuldanga, Derak, Masat, Bolsiddhi Kalinagar, Harindanga, Netra, Kanpur Dhanaberia and Parulia.
 Diamond Harbour II CD block consists of eight gram panchayats: Bhadura Haridas, Khordo, Patra, Kalatalahat, Mathur, Sarisha, Kamarpol and Nurpur.
 Falta CD block consists of 13 gram panchayats: Banganagar I, Chaluari, Gopalpur, Noyapukuria, Banganagar II, Debipur, Harindanga I, Belsingha I, Falta, Harindanga II,  Belsingha II, Fatepur and Mallikpur.
 Kulpi CD block consists of 14 gram panchayats: Baburmahal, Gajipur, Keoratala, Ramkrishnapur, Belpukur, Iswaripur, Kulpi, Ramnagar Gazipur, Chandipur, Kamarchak, Rajarampur, Dhola, Karanjali and Ramkishore.
 Magrahat I CD block consists of 11 gram panchayats: Yearpur, Lakshmikantapur, Shrichanda, Uttar Kusum, Ektara, Rangilabad, Sirakol, Hariharpur, Kalikapota, Sangrampur, Sherpur and Usthi.
 Magrahat II CD block consists of 14 gram panchayats: Amratala, Magrahat Paschim, Nainan, Dhamua Dakshnin, Gokarni, Magrahat Purba, Urelchandpur, Dhamua Uttar, Hotor Morjada,  Mohanpur, Dhanpota, Jugdia and Multi.
 Mandirbazar CD block consists of ten gram panchayats: Anchna, Nisapur, Ghateswar, Krishnapur, South Bishnupur, Dhanurhat, Jagadishpur, Chandpur Chaitanyapur, Gabberia and Kecharkur.
 Mathurapur I CD block consists of ten gram panchayats: Abad Bhagawanpur, Krishna Chandrapur, Mathurapur Purba, Uttar Lakshminarayanpur, Dakshin Laksminarayanpur, Lalpur, Nalua, Mathurapur Paschim, Shankarpur and Debipur.
 Mathurapur II CD block consists of 11 gram panchayats: Dighirpar Bakultala, Kankandighi, Kumrapara, Radhakantapur, Gilarchhat, Kasinagar, Nagendrapur, Raidighi, Kautala, Khari and Nandakumarpur.

Education
South 24 Parganas district had a literacy rate of 77.51% as per the provisional figures of the census of India 2011. Alipore Sadar subdivision had a literacy rate of 81.14%, Baruipur subdivision 77.45%, Canning subdivision 70.98%, Diamond Harbour subdivision 76.26% and Kakdwip subdivision 82.04%
  
Given in the table below (data in numbers) is a comprehensive picture of the education scenario in South 24 Parganas district, with data for the year 2013-14:

.* Does not include data for portions of South 24 Parganas district functioning under Kolkata Municipal Corporation

The following institutions are located in Diamond Harbour subdivision:
Diamond Harbour Women's University was established at Sarisha in 2013.
Neotia Institute of Technology Management and Science was established at PO Amira in 2002.
Shishuram Das College was established at Bhushna, Kamarzole in 2010,
Fakir Chand College was established at Diamond Harbour in 1948. It is the oldest college in the district.
Diamond Harbour Government Medical College and Hospital was established at Diamond Harbour in 2019.
Shirakole Mahavidyalaya was established in 2007 at Sirakol.
Sadhan Chandra Mahavidyalaya was established at Harindanga in 2007.
Dhola Mahavidyalaya was established at Dhola in 2009.
Raidighi College was established  at Raidighi in 1995.
L.J.D. College was established at Punya, PO Saharahat, in 2015.
Magrahat College was established at Magrahat in 1996.

Healthcare
The table below (all data in numbers) presents an overview of the medical facilities available and patients treated in the hospitals, health centres and sub-centres in 2014 in South 24 Parganas district.  
 

Note: The district data does not include data for portions of South 24 Parganas district functioning under Kolkata Municipal Corporation. The number of doctors exclude private bodies.

Medical facilities in Diamond Harbour subdivision are as follows:

Hospitals: (Name, location, beds)

Diamond Harbour subdivisional hospital, Diamond Harbour, 250 beds

Rural Hospitals: (Name, CD block, location, beds) 

Mathurapur Rural Hospital, Mathurapur I CD block, Mathurapur, 60 beds
Raidighi Rural Hospital, Mathurapur II CD block, Raidighi, 60 beds
Baneswarpur Rural Hospital, Mograhat I CD block, Baneswarpur, 30 beds
Magrahat Rural Hospital, Magrahat II CD block, Magrahat, 30 beds
Panchagram (Netra) Rural Hospital, Diamond Harbour I CD block, PO Panchagram Singhi, 30 beds
Naiyarat Rural Hospital, Mandirbazar CD block, Naiyarat, 30 beds

Block Primary Health Centres: (Name, CD block, location, beds)

Falta Block Primary Health Centre, Falta CD block, Falta, 10 beds
Sarisha Block Primary Health Centre, Diamond Harbour II CD block, Sarisha, 15 beds
Kulpi Block Primary Health Centre, Kulpi CD block, Kulpi, 15 beds

Primary Health Centres: (CD block-wise)(CD block, PHC location, beds)

Falta CD block: Dholtikuri (PO Charberia) (6)
Magrahat I CD block: Sirakol (6)
Magrahat II CD block: Mohanpu (6), Gokarni (6)
Diamond Harbour I CD block: Bardron (PO Hatuganj) (10), Raghunathpur (Masat) (6)
Diamond Harbour II CD block: Gandia Raghunathpur (6), Paschim Bhabanipur (PO Mukundapur) (6)
Mathurapur I CD block: Jadavpur (6), Ghatbakultala (10)
Mathurapur II CD block: Purandarpur (PO Pukurhat (6), Baribhanga Abad (6), Gilerchat (6)
Kulpi CD block: Dakshin Jagadishpur (6), Belpukur (10), Ramkishorepur (6), Jamtalhat (6)

Legislative Assembly Segments
As per order of the Delimitation Commission in respect of the Delimitation of constituencies in West Bengal, the areas under the Kulpi CD Block will form the Kulpi (Vidhan Sabha constituency). The Mathurapur II CD Block and six gram panchayats under the Mathurapur I CD Block: Abad Bhagawanpur, Debipur, Krishna Chandrapur, Lalpur, Shankarpur and Nalua, will together form the Raidighi (Vidhan Sabha constituency). The other four gram panchayats under the Mathurapur I CD Block and the areas under the Mandirbazar CD Block will together form the Mandirbazar (Vidhan Sabha constituency). The areas under the Magrahat II CD Block will form the Magrahat Purba (Vidhan Sabha constituency). The Magrahat Paschim (Vidhan Sabha constituency) will be formed by the areas covered by the Magrahat I CD Block and the Netra gram panchayat under the Diamond Harbour I CD Block. The other seven gram panchayats under the Diamond Harbour I CD Block, the Diamond Harbour Municipality and six gram panchayats under the Diamond Harbour II CD Block: Khordo, Patra, Mathur, Sarisha, Kamarpol and Nurpur, will together form the Diamond Harbour (Vidhan Sabha constituency). The other two gram panchayats under the Diamond Harbour II CD Block: Bhadura Haridas and Kalatalahat, and the Falta CD Block will define the extent of the Falta (Vidhan Sabha constituency). The legislative assembly constituencies of Mandirbazar and Magrahat Purba will be reserved for Scheduled Castes (SC) candidates. Magrahat Purba legislative assembly constituency will be a legislative assembly segment of the Jaynagar (Lok Sabha constituency), which will be reserved for Scheduled Castes (SC) candidates. The legislative assembly constituencies of Kulpi, Raidighi, Mandirbazar and Magrahat Paschim will be legislative assembly segments of the Mathurapur (Lok Sabha constituency), which will be reserved for Scheduled Castes (SC) candidates. Diamond Harbour and Falta legislative assembly constituencies will legislative assembly segments of the Diamond Harbour (Lok Sabha constituency).

References

Subdivisions of West Bengal
Subdivisions in South 24 Parganas district
South 24 Parganas district
Diamond Harbour